Akgul Amanmuradova and Ai Sugiyama were the defending champions, however Sugiyama retired at the end of 2009 and Amanmuradova teamed up with Renata Voráčová and they lost in the first round to Cara Black and Daniela Hantuchová.
Lisa Raymond and Rennae Stubbs won in the final 6–2, 2–6, [13–11], against Květa Peschke and Katarina Srebotnik.

Seeds

Draw

Draw

External links
 Main draw

Doubles
Aegon International